St Ninian's High School is a secondary school located in Douglas and Onchan, on the Isle of Man. The School is set over two different sites, catering for different year groups.

History
The modern institution originated as a 1985 union of previously independent upper and lower schools. The lower dates to 1894, originally based at Park Road in central Douglas. The upper school, Douglas High School for Boys was founded in 1927 at Ballaquayle. Alumni of the high school formed the football club Douglas High School Old Boys A.F.C.

A review of secondary education in Douglas in 1985 formed St. Ninians, establishing a new name and uniting the two parts.

In 1998, staff member Alex Townsend developed the Manx Telecomputer Bus program, which saw the development of a mobile IT classroom. While primarily aimed at supporting primary schools, the computer bus facilitated a trip to London for St. Ninian's students in 1999.

A new location was established for the lower school in 2012- relocating to Bemahague, in Onchan. This was because the Park Road site was falling into disrepair and space for further expansion was limited. The upper school had also become crowded by this time, relying on several mobile classrooms. This necessitated the construction of a new school which could take Park Road's former students as well as one year group from the upper school.

Facilities 
The Upper School campus has received many renovations over its period of existence. It is now much larger than the original construction of the 1920s. Most recently a new Sixth form Centre was built in 2000. Named the Barbra Cottier Centre, it formed a purpose built centre for Sixth Form studies. In 2006 a new dining area and Special Needs centre was built on the site of a central courtyard.

The new lower school in Onchan has several tennis courts, playing fields, modern football pitches and a large gymnasium.

Notable alumni

Samantha Barks – Actress
Prof. Martin Bridson, FRS – Whitehead Professor of Pure Mathematics, University of Oxford
Christine Collister – Award winning folk, blues and jazz singer-songwriter
Paul Quine - Member of the House of Keys and Commercial Airline Pilot who was in command of the final Manx Airlines flight
Peter Craine - Member of the House of Keys
Adam Fogerty - Actor, former boxer and rugby league footballer.
Peter Kennaugh – Cyclist and Olympic gold medalist.
Frank Kermode – literary critic and professor of English literature
Charles Kerruish – First President of Tynwald
Nigel Kneale – Best known for the creation of the character Professor Bernard Quatermass

References

External links 
School website

Schools in the Isle of Man
Douglas, Isle of Man
Onchan
Secondary schools on the Isle of Man
1985 establishments in the United Kingdom
Educational institutions established in 1985